Swan song is a reference to an ancient, controversial belief that swans sing just before they die, and also an idiom for a final performance or accomplishment.

Swan Song(s), The Swan Song or Swansong may also refer to:

Film and television

Films
 Swan Song (1945 film), an Argentine film
 Swan Song (1967 film), a Shaw Brothers film
 Swan Song (1980 film), a television film directed by Jerry London and written by Michael Mann
 Swan Song (1992 film), a film adaptation of Chekhov's play (see below)
 Swansong – the Story of Occi Burne, a 2009 film awarded a prize at 8th Irish Film & Television Awards
 Swan Song (2021 Benjamin Cleary film), a 2021 American drama film starring Mahershala Ali
 Swan Song (2021 Todd Stephens film), a 2021 American drama film starring Udo Kier

Television episodes
 "Swan Song" (Castle)
 "Swan Song" (Columbo)
 "Swan Song" (Dawson's Creek)
 "Swan Song" (Gilmore Girls)
 "Swan Song" (Glee)
 "Swan Song" (NCIS)
 "Swan Song" (Once Upon a Time)
 "Swan Song" (Supernatural)
 "Swan Song", a retrospective episode of House that preceded the series' final episode, "Everybody Dies"

Literature 
 Swansong (play), a one-act play by Anton Chekhov
 Swan Song (McCammon novel), a horror novel by Robert R. McCammon
 Swan Song (Stableford novel), a novel in the Hooded Swan series by Brian Stableford
 Swan Song, a 1928 novel by John Galsworthy in The Forsyte Saga
 Swan Song (Crispin novel), a 1947 detective novel by Edmund Crispin
 "Swan Song", a short story by Agatha Christie collected in The Listerdale Mystery
 Swan Song, a novella by Liviu Rebreanu
Swansong (Andrew novel), a 2019 novel by Kerry Andrew
 "Swansong", a short story by Shena Mackay in her 2008 collection The Atmospheric Railway

Music 
 Swan Song Records, a record label founded by Led Zeppelin
 Swan Song (Schubert) (Schwanengesang), a collection of songs by Franz Schubert
 Schwanengesang (Swan song), a poem by Johann Senn set to music by Franz Schubert

Albums
 Swan Song (album), a 2021 album by The Plot in You
 Swansong (album), a 1996 album by Carcass
 Swansongs (Chocolate Genius Album) (2010)
 Swan Songs (Epik High album) (2005)
 Swan Songs (Hollywood Undead album) (2008)
 Swansongs, a 1996 album by Flowing Tears

Songs
 "Swan Song" (song), a 2019 song by Dua Lipa from the film Alita: Battle Angel
 "Swan Song", a song by the Bee Gees from Idea
 "SwanSong", a song by the Boo Radleys from Learning to Walk
 "Swan Song", a song by Brand X from Is There Anything About?
 "Swan Song", a song by Down from NOLA
 "SwanSong", a song by Dubstar from Make It Better
 "Swan Song", a song by Grimes from Halfaxa
 "SwanSong", a song by Kristy Hanson from Already Gone (album)
 "Swan Song", a song by His Name Is Alive from Ft. Lake
 "Swansong", a song by Howards Alias from ep.i.phan.ic
 "Swan Song", a song by KinKi Kids from J Album
 "Swan Song", an unreleased song by Led Zeppelin, recorded by The Firm as "Midnight Moonlight" for The Firm
 "Swan Song", a song by Lovebites from Electric Pentagram
 "SwanSong", a song by Nurse with Wound from Alas the Madonna Does Not Function
 "SwanSong", a song by Rae & Christian from Northern Sulphuric Soul
 "Swan Song", a song by Lana Del Rey from Honeymoon
 Swansong, a 1989 composition for radio by David Sawer
 "Swan Song", a song by Set It Off
 "SwanSong", a song by 7 Seconds from Soulforce Revolution
 "Swan Song", a song by Unwritten Law from Swan
 "Swan Song", a song by Jessie Ware from Devotion
 "The Swan Song", a song by Within Temptation from The Silent Force
 "Swan Song", a song by Luniz from Silver & Black
 "Swan Song", a song by Saweetie and Niki from Shang-Chi and the Legend of the Ten Rings: The Album

Video games 
 Swan Song, a visual novel game by Flying Shine
 Vampire: The Masquerade – Swansong, a role-playing video game by Big Bad Wolf

See also 
 "Sing Swan Song", from Ege Bamyası by Can
 Labudova pesma (Swan song), an album by Riblja Čorba